Morat is a Colombian band formed in the country's capital city, Bogotá. The band is formed by Juan Pablo Isaza (guitars and vocals), Juan Pablo Villamil (banjo and vocals) and the brothers Simón Vargas (bass and choruses) and Martín Vargas (percussion and choirs). Previously, until the end of 2016, drummer Alejandro Posada had been in the band. However, the percussionist had to leave the project, being subsequently replaced by Martín Vargas.

History

Formation 
The members of Morat have known each other since they were five years old. They started playing together several times and, when they finished their formation, they decided to create a band. Some of their musical influences are Joaquín Sabina, Eric Clapton and Bacilos.

The band's original name was "Malta". The name was inspired by a pet owned by Isaza. They switched to "Morat" because it was the surname of an ancestor of Alejandro Posada, former member of the band. The name was also inspired by the farm where the band made their first rehearsals which was named "La Morat":

2014–2017: Sobre el amor y sus efectos secundarios 
Morat saw their first turning point when the singer Paulina Rubio showed interests in their composition "Mi Nuevo Vicio" and wanted them to turn it into a single. In 2015, "Mi Nuevo Vicio" was released under the collaboration of Paulina Rubio and Morat, achieving great success internationally. The single rose to No.12 on the Billboard Latin Pop Airplay chart, and reached No.1 in Spain. The single was also certified Platinum Record.

At the end of 2015, they received another international success with the new single, "Cómo te atreves", reaching the peak position in iTunes and bringing them to fame in Spain. In June 2016, Morat released their first studio album Sobre el amor y sus efectos secundarios through Universal Music Spain. The album debuted No.1 in several Hispanic countries such as Colombia, Mexico or Spain. Within this album, Morat obtained 4× Platinum Record as well as a Latin Grammy award nomination for "Cómo te atreves", and Golden Record for "Cuánto me duele".

In 2017, Morat produced the single "Yo Contigo, Tú Conmigo" in collaboration with Álvaro Soler as the theme music of Despicable Me 3. The single peaked at No.9 on Billboard on August 19, 2017 and won the "Song of the Year" award in LOS40 Music Awards 2017. This single was later included in the re-issue of Sobre el amor y sus efectos secundarios, which also contains the acoustic version of "Cómo te atreves".

2017–2019: Balas perdidas 
In 2018, Morat released their second studio album the single Balas perdidas. The single "Cuando nadie ve" peaked at No.1 on Billboard on August 18, 2018, and the single "No se va", released on March 7, 2019, hit almost 2 million visits on YouTube in less than a week.

Equipped with these success, Morat kicked off their first-ever US tour titled "Balas perdidas" to promote their album in 2019, with first performance in San Francisco on April 4, 2019. The tour ended in Orlando on May 5, 2019, with performance in other cities such as Los Angeles, Chicago, and New York.

In April 2019, Morat released a song collaborated with Aitana named "Presiento". This single received more than 600,000 streams in Spotify in its first 24 hours. After that period of time, "Presiento" became the song with the highest debut in Spain, with more than 230,000 streams there, beating Rosalía and J Balvin's 2019 track "Con altura". "Presiento" was later included in the re-issue of Balas perdidas, Balas perdidas (Edición especial), on May 10, 2019, together with three other songs.

On December 15, 2019, Morat ended their Spain tour with the last performance at the WiZink Center in Madrid. Antonio José, Aitana, Cali y El Dandee, and Cami were also invited to perform at this concert. Up to this show, Morat has held more than 80 concerts in 13 countries.

2019–2021: ¿A dónde vamos?
On December 13, 2019, Morat released the song "Enamórate de alguien más".

On March 6, 2020, Morat released "No Termino", the third preview of their third album and the first of 2020. On April 2, "Nunca te olvide", the fourth single from the third album, was released, the video clip of the song premiered on May 1, which features some of the band's followers. On May 22, "Bajo la mesa", along with Sebastián Yatra, was released, the fifth single from the third album and the first one that includes collaboration. On June 11, their collaboration with Reik came out with their song "La Bella y la Bestia." On July 30 they released "Más de lo que aposté", their second collaboration with Aitana, and on August 6, "Labios Rotos", which is a tribute to the Mexican band Zoé (band).

On November 7, and after more than 5 months without playing on stage, they offered a virtual concert through the Rappi Live Events platform called "Echando un cuento." According to the app, it was the best-selling virtual concert on the continent in 2020.

On November 13, "Al aire" was released, the sixth single from their third album, with its respective video clip, which was recorded in the municipality of Guasca, Cundinamarca.

On March 11, 2021, they released the single "No hay más que hablar". A week later, they released the single "De cero".

On April 15, they collaborate with Beret on the song, "Porfa no te vayas".

On June 3, 2021, they released a collaboration with Danna Paola. On July 15, 2021, Morat released their third studio album, ¿A dónde vamos?. That same day they released the single "Simplemente Pasan", along with Cami.

2021–present: Si ayer fuera hoy 
On November 4, 2022, Morat released their fourth studio album, Si ayer fuera hoy.

Members 
Current
 Juan Pablo Isaza Piñeros – guitar, piano, ukulele, voice and choirs.
 Juan Pablo Villamil Cortez– banjo, voice and choirs.
 Simón Vargas Morales – bass guitar, voice and choirs.
 Martín Vargas Morales – percussion, drum, voice and choirs.

Former

 Alejandro Posada – percussion, voice and choirs

Discography

Studio albums

Extended plays

Singles

As lead artist

As featured artist

Awards and nominations

Personal life 
On March 27, 2020, Morat posted an announcement as well as a three-minute-long video on Instagram, saying that one of its members, Juan Pablo Villamil, had tested positive for coronavirus (COVID-19) after traveling to Spain and Mexico. In the video, the band explained that they were visiting Spain and Mexico two weeks ago and as soon as they arrived in Bogota, Colombia, they took safety precautions to self-quarantine.

References 

Colombian pop musicians